"Dance You Off" is a 2018 song by Swedish singer Benjamin Ingrosso. The song won Melodifestivalen 2018, and made it to the final from the first semifinal. It was released in February 2018. The song won Melodifestivalen and represented Sweden in the Eurovision Song Contest 2018 in Lisbon, Portugal. The song was later included on Ingrosso's debut album, Identification.

Melodifestivalen
Being Ingrosso's second participation in the Swedish Eurovision selection, "Dance You Off" participated in the first semi-final of the 2018 Melodifestivalen which was held in Karlstad's Löfbergs Arena on 3 February 2018. The song was performed last at the semi-final and it direct qualified to the final as it got the most votes in the semi-final. On 10 March, during the final at the Friends Arena in Solna, Ingrosso performed the song at the eleventh position of the running order. "Dance You Off" won the selection with 114 points from the international juries and 67 points from the public vote, receiving 181 points in total.

Eurovision Song Contest

"Dance You Off" was performed on 10 May 2018 in the second semi-final of Eurovision Song Contest in Lisbon, Portugal. The song made it to the Grand final, where it placed seventh with 274 points. It received the maximum 12 points from the juries of eight countries.

Track listing

Charts

Weekly charts

Year-end charts

Certifications

References

2018 singles
Songs about dancing
English-language Swedish songs
Benjamin Ingrosso songs
Melodifestivalen songs of 2018
Eurovision songs of Sweden
Eurovision songs of 2018
Swedish pop songs
Songs written by Louis Schoorl
Songs written by Benjamin Ingrosso
2018 songs